Valeriy Honcharov (also spelled Goncharov, born 19 September 1977) is a gymnast from Ukraine. He won gold in the men's parallel bars apparatus at the 2004 Summer Olympics in Athens.

References

External links
 
 
 

1977 births
Sportspeople from Kharkiv
Living people
Ukrainian male artistic gymnasts
Olympic gymnasts of Ukraine
Gymnasts at the 2000 Summer Olympics
Gymnasts at the 2004 Summer Olympics
Gymnasts at the 2008 Summer Olympics
Olympic gold medalists for Ukraine
Olympic silver medalists for Ukraine
Medalists at the World Artistic Gymnastics Championships
Olympic medalists in gymnastics
Medalists at the 2000 Summer Olympics
Medalists at the 2004 Summer Olympics
Universiade medalists in gymnastics
Universiade silver medalists for Ukraine
Universiade bronze medalists for Ukraine
Medalists at the 2003 Summer Universiade